Carmichael v National Power plc [1999] UKHL 47 is a British labour law case on the contract of employment for the purpose of the Employment Rights Act 1996.

Facts
Tour guides had complained that they hadn't received written statement of the employment contracts under s.1 of the Employment Rights Act 1996. They worked at Blyth Power Stations in Northumberland, for the Central Electricity Generating Board. Their hiring contracts said ‘I am pleased to note that you are agreeable to be employed by the C.E.G.B. at Blyth ‘A’ and ‘B’ power stations on a casual as required basis as a station guide.’

Judgment
The House of Lords decided that they were not employees for the purpose of s 1, because there was not sufficient 'mutuality of obligation' when the guides were not actually guiding. Lord Irvine of Lairg said that there would not have been an ‘irreducible minimum of mutuality of obligation necessary to create a contract of service’ (relying on Nethermere) between the times actually working (while working the situation would be different). Their claim failed on the basis that on many occasions they would be called up but say they could not work.

Lord Hoffmann stated, at 1233,

"…the terms of the contract are a question of fact. And of course the question of whether the parties intended a document or documents to be the exclusive record of the terms of their agreement is also a question of fact."

"The evidence of a party as to what terms he understood to have been agree is some evidence tending to show that those terms, in an objective sense, were agreed. Of course the tribunal may reject such evidence and conclude that the party misunderstood the effect of what was being said and done. But when both parties are agreed about what they understood their mutual obligations (or lack of them) to be, it is a strong thing to exclude their evidence from consideration."

See also
UK labour law

Notes

References
E McGaughey, A Casebook on Labour Law (Hart 2018) ch 3

External links
Text of the full judgment, 18 November 1999

United Kingdom labour case law
House of Lords cases
1999 in case law
1999 in British law
Electric power in the United Kingdom